Ashina Mishe (?–662) was a puppet Turkic khagan installed by the Emperor Gaozong of the Tang dynasty to rule over former Western Turkic territories. Xue Zongzheng suggested he and Duolu Khagan were the same person.

Early life 
He was titled Baghatur Yabgu before 632. In 632, Tang dynasty sent official Liu Shanyin (刘善因) to create him Xilibi Dulu Khagan (奚利邲咄陆可汗). However, he was in bad terms with his elder cousin Ashina Buzhen who wanted to take his lands and people. In order to escape his machinations, he submitted to Tang in 639 with his subordinate tribes Chuyue and Chumi. He was soon created a general and took part in Goguryeo-Tang war in 645, for which Taizong awarded him with title Count of Pyongyang (平壤县伯).

Later life 
After Su Dingfang's conquest of Western Turks, was created Xingxiwang Khagan and Protectorate General to Pacify the West was divided in half, Kunling Protectorate and Tulu tribes being awarded to Mishe. However, in 662 Emperor Gaozong sent the general Su Haizheng (蘇海政) to attack Qiuzi and ordered Ashina Mishe and Ashina Buzhen to assist him.  Ashina Buzhen, who had a rivalry with Ashina Mishe, falsely informed Su that Ashina Mishe was set to rebel and would attack the Tang army, and Su responded by ambushing Ashina Mishe, killing him and his chief assistants.   Shunishi chief Chupan (鼠尼施處半啜) and Basaigan chief Tong Ishbara (拔塞幹暾沙鉢俟斤) angry over Ashina Mishe's death, largely turned away from Tang and submitted to the Tibetan Empire instead, and when Ashina Buzhen died later that year, Tang influence in the region was greatly reduced.

Family 
He had at least three issues:

 Ashina Yuanqing
 Ashina Babu – submitted to Tibetan Empire, joined Ashina Tuizi
 Ashina Poluo – submitted to Tibetan Empire, joined Ashina Tuizi

References 

7th-century Turkic people
Ashina house of the Turkic Empire
Göktürk people
Tang dynasty generals at war against the Göktürks
Tang dynasty generals at war against Goguryeo
Göktürk khagans